Jagdfliegerführer Ostmark (Fighter Leader Ostmark) was formed September 6, 1943 in Vienna, subordinated to 7. Jagd-Division. The headquarters was located at Wien-Kobenzl. The unit was redesignated 8. Jagd-Division on June 15, 1944.

Commanding officers
Oberst Gotthard Handrick, September 1943 - June 1944

References
Notes

References

Luftwaffe Fliegerführer
Military units and formations established in 1943
Military units and formations disestablished in 1944